Derek Ik Ogbeide (born March 28, 1997) is a Nigerian-Canadian professional basketball player who last played for Konyaspor.

High School career
Ogbeide played in grade 9 and 10 for Monsignor Percy Johnson Catholic Secondary School in Toronto, Canada. Ogbeide played for Pebblebrook High School, at Mableton, Georgiain grade 11 and 12.

College career
Ogbeide played for Georgia from 2015 until 2019.

Professional career
Ogbeide started his professional with AEK Larnaca of the Cypriot League. After a successful first season with AEK, he renewed his contract with the team for one more season. During his second season, he won the Cypriot Cup with AEK Larnaca. On May 27, 2021, he joined Hapoel Eilat.

On June 27, 2021, Ogbeide officially signed with PAOK of the Greek Basket League and the Basketball Champions League. On January 8, 2022, he mutually parted ways with the Greek club. In 8 Greek league games, Ogbeide averaged 6.4 points and 3.4 rebounds per contest, while in 7 BCL matches he put up a stat sheet of merely 3.1 points and 2.9 rebounds per game. On January 10, he signed with Torku Konyaspor of the Turkish Basketball First League.

References

External links
RealGM.com Profile
Eurobasket.com Profile

1997 births
Living people
21st-century African-American sportspeople
African-American basketball players
American expatriate basketball people in Cyprus
American expatriate basketball people in Greece
Georgia Bulldogs basketball players
Nigerian men's basketball players
P.A.O.K. BC players
Torku Konyaspor B.K. players